Toronto Police Headquarters is the headquarters of the Toronto Police Service, located at 40 College Street in Toronto, Ontario, Canada. It is the first purpose-built police headquarters in Toronto since the formation of the city's original police force in 1835.

History
The current headquarters is on the former site of the downtown Toronto YMCA building at Bay Street and Grenville Street. The Central YMCA Building was built in 1913 and vacated in 1984 for the new YMCA building on Grosvenor Street.

Architecture
Completed in 1988 by Toronto firms Shore Tilbe Henschel Irwin & Peters and Mathers & Haldenby, the twelve floor, 50m tall building is an example of Postmodern architecture. It was built to replace the older and smaller office on Jarvis Street.

The building is composed of a series of glass block and pink granite cubes, which step back as they rise along College and Grenville streets. An octagonal twelve-storey tower meets the southeast corner of Bay and Grenville streets. Natural light pours into the central area of the building through a ten-storey high atrium. A domed roof crowns the elevator lobby atop the terraced structure.

Street officer nicknames for the structure can vary, depending on the individual officer's opinion of headquarters as an institution: "the Pink Palace" and "the Pink Whorehouse" are two examples.

A fully stocked bar has been located on the 4th floor since 1988.  It is operated by the Toronto Police Senior Officers' Association, and access to the bar is limited to senior officers – those ranked inspector or above.

Previous Police Headquarters (1835–1988)

 590 Jarvis Street was a headquarters for the then Metropolitan Toronto Police from 1967 to 1988, then used by the City of Toronto until it was sold and torn down for residential development. The 6-storey building was built originally for the Foresters, until the group moved to Don Mills.
 Old Imperial Oil Building (92 King Street East, built 1917) became Police Headquarters in 1960 after Imperial Oil moved to the Imperial Oil Building in 1957. Police remained here until 1967. The building has since been demolished and is now King Plaza condo (c. 1991); a doorway pediment was recovered and is now located at Guild Park and Gardens.
 149 College Street was headquarters for the then Toronto Police Department from 1932 (Metro Toronto Police from 1957) to 1960.

Toronto Police Department headquarters from 1835 to 1932:

 Old City Hall (Toronto) 1902-1932 - force was located in offices within City Hall building
 8 Court Street 1876-1902 - co-shared as police station; demolished and now site of Court House Park since 1997
 St. Lawrence Market 1835-1876 - Constables based out of South Market building c. 1850 with earlier buildings torn down or burned down

References

External links

Municipal buildings in Toronto
Postmodern architecture in Canada
Toronto Police Service
Police headquarters in Canada
1988 establishments in Ontario
Government buildings completed in 1988